Exosonic, Inc is an American startup company designing a supersonic transport aircraft. The company hopes to receive certification for their aircraft by 2029.

History
The company was founded in June 2019 by Norris Tie and Tim MacDonald. In August 2020 they were awarded a $1 million small business innovation research contract by the United States Air Force to prototype their aircraft for use as Air Force One.

Aircraft
Exosonic's proposed aircraft is a Mach 1.8 airliner with 70 seats. As of June 2021 the design was undergoing scale-model wind tunnel testing. The aircraft is under contract to be modified for possible function as Air Force One.

See also
 Aerion
 Boom Supersonic
 Hermeus
 Spike Aerospace

References

External links
 

Aircraft manufacturers of the United States
Aerospace companies of the United States